The 1988 Philippine Basketball Association (PBA) Reinforced Conference was the third and last conference of the 1988 PBA season. It started on October 2 and ended on December 13, 1988. The tournament is an Import-laden format, which requires two imports with a combined ceiling of 12 ft. 8 in. for each team.

Format
The following format will be observed for the duration of the conference:
 Double-round robin eliminations; 10 games per team; Teams are then seeded by basis on win–loss records.
 Team with the worst record after the elimination round will be eliminated. 
 Semifinals will be two round robin affairs with the five remaining teams. Results from the elimination round will be carried over.
 The top two teams in the semifinals advance to the best of seven finals. The last two teams dispute the third-place trophy in a best-of-five playoff.

Imports
Each team was allowed two imports. The first line in the table are the original reinforcements of the teams. Below the name are the replacement of the import above. Same with the third replacement that is also highlighted with a different color. GP is the number of games played.

Elimination round

Semifinals

Cumulative standings

Semifinal round standings:

Third place playoffs

Finals

References

PBA Reinforced Conference
Reinforced Conference